Women's Overall World Cup 1966/1967

Final point standings

In Women's Overall World Cup 1966/67 the best three downhills, best three giant slaloms and best three slaloms count.

Women's overall
FIS Alpine Ski World Cup overall titles